Kapseret is a constituency in Kenya, one of six constituencies in Uasin Gishu County.

References 

Constituencies in Uasin Gishu County